Karefa Kargbo is a Sierra Leonean politician. He was the foreign minister under Valentine Strasser in 1993 and 1994 under the National Provisional Ruling Council, the military coup that overthrew Joseph Saidu Momoh as president.

He is the Chief Accountant at the Petroleum Resources Unit {PRU} he was appointed by Ernest Bai Koroma.

References

Living people
Year of birth missing (living people)
Foreign Ministers of Sierra Leone